This is a list of foreign-born football players who played for the Philippines national football team. Players born in countries other than the Philippines including those born in diaspora may qualify for the Philippines team through Filipino parents or grandparents, or through naturalization as Philippine citizens.

The Philippines is noted for including Filipinos of foreign-descent in their national football teams. Most of these players are born abroad. They have naturalized only one player without any Filipino ancestry so far – Bienvenido Marañón

This list excludes players with non-Filipino heritage such as Filipino-Japanese Daisuke Sato (Davao-born), Filipino-Iranian Misagh Bahadoran (Pampanga-born) and Simone Rota (adopted by Italian parents). This only includes players that have made at least one international cap for the Philippine national team.

List of players

Men

List

By country of birth

Women

List

By country of birth

Notes

References

born outside
Lists of expatriate association football players
Association football player non-biographical articles
Immigration to the Philippines
Change of nationality in sport